Benno Mengele (11 December 1898 in Zwettl, Lower Austria – 15 September 1971 in Vienna) was an Austrian electrical engineer.

Mengele studied from 1918 to 1923 at the Vienna University of Technology and worked from 1922 at the Austrian Siemens-Schuckert. He developed protective earthing and fault current, and in 1929, he and Gustav Markt developed the overhead power line (bundle conductors) for high-voltage and ultrahigh-voltage power transmission. He also built the first hydrogen-cooled three-phase motor in Austria. In 1965, he was awarded an honorary doctorate from the Vienna University of Technology.

References

1898 births
1971 deaths
Austrian electrical engineers
People from Zwettl
TU Wien alumni